Fasten may mean:
 to join or attach, for example using a fastener or a knot
 Fasten (company), American vehicle for hire company
 Bertil Fastén, Swedish athlete